The Applejacks were a group of American studio musicians led by Dave Appell, (March 24, 1922 – November 18, 2014), a native of Philadelphia, Pennsylvania. They released singles on Cameo Records. Their biggest hit was the instrumental "Mexican Hat Rock", a Top 20 hit in the U.S. in 1958.

Singles
"Mexican Hat Rock" (1958) U.S. No. 16
"Rocka-Conga" (1959) U.S. No. 38 (Early releases of "Rocka-Conga" were pressed as "Rocka-Tonga")
"Bunny Hop" (1959) U.S. No. 70

References

American pop music groups
Cameo Records artists